Thayal Eniyadi is a place that comes under Bandadka village and Kuttikol panchayath. In Thayal Eniyadi there is a Masjid named New Badar Masjid.This Masjid comes under Eniyadi Juma Masjid. About 500 people live in Thayal Eniyadi. Nearby there is a religious place Eniyadi Maqam.

Religious Centers 
 New Badar Masjid

Nearby places 
 Moola   
 Kappana   
 Villaram vayal   
 Kundoochy

Demographics
 India census, Thayal Eniyadi had a population of  500+.

Transportation
This village is connected to Karnataka state through Panathur. There is a 20 km road from Panathur to Sullia in Karnataka from where Bangalore and Mysore can be easily accessed. Locations in Kerala can be accessed by driving towards the western side. The nearest railway station is Kanhangad railway station on Mangalore-Palakkad line. There are airports at Mangalore and Calicut.

References

External links 
 https://www.facebook.com/Hudaif.Mohammed.Official

Panathur area